Chaetochromin, also known as 4548-G05, is an orally active, small-molecule, selective agonist of the insulin receptor. It has potent and long-lasting antidiabetic activity in vivo in mice. The drug may represent a novel potential therapeutic agent for the treatment of diabetes which is more convenient and tolerable to administer than injected insulin. It was discovered in 1981 in Chaetomium gracile fungi, and its interaction with the insulin receptor was identified in 2014.

Stereochemistry
Chaetochromin A and B are stereoisomers of this structure, while chaetochromin C and D are related but different compounds. It is not known whether the insulin mimetic effect was found in chaetochromin A or B, or in a mixture.

See also
 Anti-diabetic medication

References

Polyphenols
Anti-diabetic drugs
Benzochromenes
Diketones
Heterocyclic compounds with 3 rings
Insulin receptor agonists
3-Hydroxypropenals
Resorcinols
Biphenyls